Notarcha muscerdalis is a moth in the family Crambidae. It was described by Zeller in 1852. It is found in Malawi and South Africa.

References

Moths described in 1852
Spilomelinae